KLNZ (103.5 FM, "La Tricolor 103.5") is a regional Mexican-formatted radio station serving the Phoenix, Arizona area. The station is owned by Entravision Communications. KLNZ is licensed to the nearby suburb of Glendale and broadcasts programming from Entravision's California-based "Radio Tricolor" network. The station also broadcasts with digital HD Radio technology.  Its studios are located in Phoenix near Sky Harbor Airport, and the transmitter is located west of Surprise.

History
103.5 signed on the air on May 18, 1994, as KTWC ("Twice 103.5") with an eclectic oldies-based format with music ranging from the 1950s through the 1980s. The station was owned by Newmountain II Broadcasting Co. of Phoenix, which tapped Media America Corp., owners of KESZ and KTVK, to build the facility and sell ad time while Newmountain handled programming. In 1996, KTWC was purchased outright by MAC America Communications (the renamed Media America) and was changed to Smooth Jazz-formatted KOAZ ("The Oasis"), competing with KYOT-FM, on May 17 of that year.

In 1997, MAC America decided to sell half its interest in the station to Owens Broadcasting, owners of heritage country station KNIX-FM. The format was switched once again to country, targeting a younger audience and going by the name of KWCY ("Wild Country"), on September 2, 1997. A huge marketing campaign coincided with the change, publicizing the return of popular morning hosts Tim & Willy, who were at KMLE for a few years before a brief stint in Chicago. Tim & Willy eventually became morning hosts at KNIX. Giving up on the frequency, KWCY was put up for sale in June 1998.

Z-Spanish Radio Networks bought the station in late 1998, and placed its Sacramento-based "La Zeta" Regional Mexican format on 103.5 in December. At the time, the station became KLNZ. Entravision merged with Z-Spanish a year later, and its Zeta-formatted stations became Radio Tricolor.

Previous logo

References

External links

Hispanic and Latino American culture in Phoenix, Arizona
Mexican-American culture in Arizona
LNZ
Regional Mexican radio stations in the United States
Entravision Communications stations